The 1934 Sewanee Tigers football team was an American football team that represented Sewanee: The University of the South as a member of the Southeastern Conference during the 1934 college football season. In their fourth season under head coach Harry E. Clark, Sewanee compiled a 2–7 record.

Schedule

References

Sewanee
Sewanee Tigers football seasons
Sewanee Tigers football